is a train station in Ukyo-ku, Kyoto, Japan. The station (and surrounding neighborhood) are named for Emperor Hanazono, who had a palace in the area, now the Myōshin-ji temple complex.

Line 
 West Japan Railway Company (JR West) 
 Sagano Line (Sanin Main Line)

Layout 
The elevated station has an island platform with two tracks.

History 
Hanazono Station opened on 1 January 1898, less than one year after the opening of the Kyoto Railway (predecessor of the San'in Main Line).

Station numbering was introduced in March 2018 with Hanazono being assigned station number JR-E06.

Surrounding area 
Just to the north and east is the major temple complex of Myōshin-ji, and the affiliated Hanazono University (to the east, actually closer to Emmachi Station).

References 

Railway stations in Kyoto Prefecture
Railway stations in Japan opened in 1898
Railway stations in Kyoto
Sanin Main Line